African-American Muslims, also colloquially known as Black Muslims, are an African American religious minority. About 1% of African Americans are Muslims. Nonetheless, African American Muslims account for over 20% of American Muslims. They represent one of the larger minority Muslim populations of the United States as there is no ethnic group that makes up the majority of American Muslims. They are represented in Sunni and Shia denominations as well as smaller sects, such as the Nation of Islam. The history of African-American Muslims is related to African-American history in general, and goes back to the Revolutionary and Antebellum eras.

History
Historically, an estimated 30% of slaves brought to the Americas from West/Central Africa were Muslims. They were overwhelmingly literate in contrast to many of the slave owners, and thus were given supervisory roles. Most of these captives were forced into Christianity during the era of American slavery; however, there are records of individuals such as Omar ibn Said living the rest of their lives as Muslims in the United States. During the twentieth century, some African Americans converted to Islam, mainly through the influence of black nationalist groups that preached with distinctive Islamic practices including the Moorish Science Temple of America, founded in 1913, and the Nation of Islam, founded in the 1930s, which attracted at least 20,000 people by 1963. Prominent members included activist Malcolm X and boxer Muhammad Ali. Ahmadiyya Muslim groups also sought converts among African Americans in the 1920s and 1930s.

Malcolm X is considered the first person to start the movement among African Americans towards mainstream Islam, after he left the Nation and made the pilgrimage to Mecca. In 1975, Warith Deen Mohammed, the son of Elijah Muhammad took control of the Nation after his father's death and guided the majority of its members to orthodox Islam. However, a few members rejected these changes, in particular Louis Farrakhan, who revived the Nation of Islam in 1978 based largely on the ideals of its founder, Wallace Fard Muhammad.

Demographics
African-American Muslims constitute 20% of the total U.S. Muslim population. The majority are Sunni Muslims; a substantial proportion of these identify under the community of W. Deen Mohammed. Cities with large concentration of African-American Muslims include Chicago, Detroit, New York City, Newark, Washington. D.C, Philadelphia, and Atlanta. The Nation of Islam led by Louis Farrakhan has a membership ranging from 20,000–50,000 members.

Sects

During the first half of the 20th century, a small number of African Americans established groups based on Islamic and Gnostic teachings. The first of these groups was the Moorish Science Temple of America, founded by Timothy Drew (Drew Ali) in 1913. Drew taught that black people were of Moorish origin but their Muslim identity was taken away through slavery and racial segregation, advocating the return to Islam of their Moorish ancestry.

Sunni Islam

Sunni is a term derived from sunnah (سُنَّة /ˈsunna/, plural سُنَن sunan /ˈsunan/) meaning "habit", "usual practice", "custom", "tradition". The Muslim use of this term refers to the sayings and living habits of Muhammad. Its adherents are referred to in Arabic as ahl as-sunnah wa l-jamāʻah ("the people of the sunnah and the community") or ahl as-sunnah for short. In English, its adherents are known as Sunni Muslims, Sunnis, Sunnites and Ahlus Sunnah. Sunni Islam is sometimes referred to as "orthodox Islam". The Quran, together with hadith (especially those collected in Kutub al-Sittah) and binding juristic consensus form the basis of all traditional jurisprudence within Sunni Islam. Sharia rulings are derived from these basic sources, in conjunction with analogical reasoning, consideration of public welfare and juristic discretion, using the principles of jurisprudence developed by the traditional legal schools.

The conversion of Malik el-Shabazz (better known as Malcolm X) in 1964 is widely regarded as the turning point for the spread of orthodox Sunni Islam among Black American Muslims. Encouraged to learn about Sunni Islam after his departure from the Nation of Islam, he converted; others from the Nation of Islam soon followed. Warith Deen Mohammed rose to leadership of the Nation of Islam in 1975 following the death of his father Elijah Muhammad and began the groundbreaking, though sometimes controversial, process of leading Black Muslims out of the NOI and into Sunni Islam. As a result of his personal thinking and studies of the Quran, he became part of Ahlus Sunnah during a term in federal prison from 1961–1963 for refusing induction into the United States military.

Mohammed introduced many reforms and began an information campaign about Sunni Islam much as el-Shabazz had years earlier. He stated that Fard was not divine and that his father was not a prophet. All of the over 400 temples were converted into traditional Islamic mosques, and he introduced the Five Pillars of Islam to his followers. He rejected literal interpretations of his father's theology and Black-separatist views and on the basis of his intensive independent study of Islamic law, history, and theology, he accepted whites as fellow worshipers. However, he also encouraged African Americans to separate themselves from their pasts, in 1976 calling upon them to change their surnames which were often given to their ancestors by slave masters. He forged closer ties with mainstream Muslim communities, including Hispanic and Latino American Muslims. By 1978 he had succeeded in leading the majority of the original NOI to Sunni Islam which still stands as the largest mass conversion to Islam in the United States. In many urban areas of the United States today many Black Muslims in the Sunni tradition are known and recognized by the hijabs on women and kufi caps and long beards for men. These beards are grown as an adherence to the Sunnah of Muhammad for men to let their beards grow. Commonly called Sunnah beards, and Sunni Beards, among Muslims and more recently known as Philly beards have also gained popularity among non Muslim men emulating Muslim style.

Moorish Science Temple of America

The Moorish Science Temple of America (MSTA) is an American organization founded in 1913 by self-proclaimed prophet, Noble Drew Ali. Though his name at birth was widely touted to have been 'Timothy Drew', it was more likely 'Thomas' Drew based on census records and an early-life autobiographical depiction. Born in 1886 in North Carolina, Drew Ali claimed to be returning his people (i.e. fellow so-called 'African-Americans') to the Creed and Principles (the 'Iman' or 'Aqeedah') of their traditional ancestral religion of ('old time' Ibrahimic-Creedal) Islam.  Notably in this regard, his teachings aligned with very refined Mystical-Islamic (aka 'Sufi') teachings regarding the Higher Self ('Ruh') and the lower self ('nafs').  Drew Ali's scriptures also spoke to key elements drawn from Buddhism, as well as Christianity via Gnosticism, and Taoism via Confucianism. This tradition's strong African-American demography, as well as its significant 'Iman' (Creedal-Faith) rooted divergence from modern-day Islam's more exclusive 'tarbiya' (religious-educational) focus on the five Sunni Pillars (ie on 'Islam' or 'Fiqh' first, rather than 'Iman' or 'Creedal Principles') has rendered a matter of mainstream Islamic and religious scholastic debate whether Moorish Scientific Islam should be classified as an acceptable 'modern-day Islamic (fiqh) denomination' rather than as an (OLD time) Islamic Creed ('Aqeedah') Principled faith ('Iman') tradition.

Per Act 6 of the MSTA's Divine Constitution, this tradition's most unique primary tenet is that (so-called) African-Americans are actually "... descendants of the ancient Moabites who inhabited the Northwestern and Southwestern shores of Africa." The teachings have also been interpreted to suggest that the descendants of those Moors who were conquered in Spain (rather than Moors indigenous to Western Africa) were most dominant among those captured and held in US slavery from 1779–1865 by slaveholders.

Although often accused of lacking mainstream-academically sanctioned (aka scientific) merit, a number of students of Noble Drew Ali's core sacred literary corpus (as preserved by the MSTA) believe that the (so called) Negroid Asiatic was the first human inhabitant of the Western Hemisphere. Drawing from their religious texts (ex. Ch 45 of the Moorish Holy Scripture), adherents refer to their race as "Asiatic" and their (Asiatic) Divine ancestral (sub-)nationality as Moorish-American. presumably referring to the non-Mongoloid Paleoamericans (see Luzia Woman). In implicit acknowledgement of this distinct historiographical perspective, these adherents call themselves "Moorish-Americans" (or sometimes "Indigenous Moors", or "American Moors"), rather than "African Moors" or "African Americans".

Nation of Islam

The Nation of Islam (NOI) was created in 1930 by Wallace Fard Muhammad. Fard drew inspiration for NOI doctrines from those of Timothy Drew's Moorish Science Temple of America. He provided three main principles which serve as the foundation of the NOI: "Allah is God, the white man is the devil and the so-called Negroes are the Asiatic Black People, the cream of the planet earth".

In 1934 Elijah Muhammad became the leader of the NOI. He deified Fard, saying that he was an incarnation of God, and taught that he was a prophet who had been taught directly by God in the form of Fard. Two of the most famous people to join the NOI were Malcolm X, who became the face of the NOI in the media, and Muhammad Ali, who, while initially rejected, was accepted into the group shortly after his first world heavyweight championship victory. Both Malcolm X and Ali later became Sunni Muslims.

Malcolm X was one of the most influential leaders of the NOI and, in accordance with NOI doctrine, advocated the complete separation of blacks from whites. He left the NOI after being silenced for 90 days (due to a controversial comment on the John F. Kennedy assassination), and proceeded to form Muslim Mosque, Inc. and the Organization of Afro-American Unity before his pilgrimage to Mecca and conversion to Sunni Islam. He is viewed as the first person to start the movement among African Americans towards Sunni Islam.

Muhammad died in 1975 and his son, Warith Deen Mohammed, became the leader of the Nation of Islam. He led the organization toward Sunni Islam and renamed it the World Community of Islam in the West the following year. Louis Farrakhan, who quit Warith Deen Mohammed's group, started an organization along the lines of Elijah Muhammad's teachings. Farrakhan renamed his organization the Nation of Islam in 1981, and has regained many properties associated with Elijah Muhammad, such as Mosque Maryam, its Chicago headquarters.

It was estimated that the Nation of Islam had at least 20,000 members in 2006. However, today the group has a wide influence in the African American community. The first Million Man March took place in Washington, D.C. in 1995 and was followed later by another one in 2000 which was smaller in size but more inclusive, welcoming individuals other than just African American men. The group sponsors cultural and academic education, economic independence, and personal and social responsibility.

The Nation of Islam has received a great deal of criticism for its anti-white, anti-Christian, and anti-semitic teachings, and is listed as a hate group by the Southern Poverty Law Center.

Five-Percent Nation

The Five-Percent Nation, sometimes referred to the "Nation of Gods and Earths" (NGE/NOGE) or the "Five Percenters", is an American organization founded in 1964 in the Harlem section of the borough of Manhattan, New York City, by a former member of the Nation of Islam named Clarence 13X (born Clarence Edward Smith and later known as "Allah the Father"). Clarence 13X, a former student of Malcolm X, left the Nation of Islam after a theological dispute with the Nation's leaders over the nature and identity of God. Specifically, Clarence 13X denied that the Nation's biracial founder Wallace Fard Muhammad was Allah and instead taught that the black man was himself God personified.

Members of the group call themselves Allah's Five Percenters, which reflects the concept that ten percent of the people in the world know the truth of existence, and those elites and agents opt to keep eighty-five percent of the world in ignorance and under their controlling thumb; the remaining five percent are those who know the truth and are determined to enlighten the rest.

United Nation of Islam

The United Nation of Islam (UNOI) is a group based in Kansas City, Kansas. It was founded in 1978 by Royall Jenkins, who continues to be the leader of the group and styles himself "Royall, Allah in Person".

Conversion to orthodox Sunni Islam
After the death of Elijah Muhammad, he was succeeded by his son, Warith Deen Mohammed. Mohammed rejected many teachings of his father, such as the divinity of Fard Muhammad, and saw a white person as also a worshiper. As he took control of the organization, he quickly brought in new reforms. He renamed it the World Community of al-Islam in the West; later it became the American Society of Muslims. It was estimated that there were 200,000 followers of W. D. Mohammed at the time.

W. D. Mohammed introduced teachings which were based on orthodox Sunni Islam. He removed the chairs in the organization's temples, and replaced the entire "temple" concept with the traditional Muslim house of worship, the mosque, also teaching how to pray the salat, to observe the fasting of Ramadan, and to attend the pilgrimage to Mecca.

A small number of Black Muslims however rejected these new reforms brought by Imam Mohammed. Louis Farrakhan who broke away from the organization, re-established the Nation of Islam under the original Fardian doctrines, and remains its leader.

Ahmadiyya

Although at first the Ahmadiyya Muslim Community's efforts were broadly spread out over a large number of racial and ethnic groups, subsequent realization of the deep-seated racial tensions and discrimination in the US made Ahmadi missionaries focus their attention on mainly African Americans and the Muslim immigrant community. Ahmadis often became vocal proponents of the Civil Rights Movement. In recent times, many any Ahmadi Muslims fled countries like Pakistan as refugees due to persecution; this has brought a small second wave of Ahmadis to the United States.

Prison conversions to Islam

Conversion to Islam is a practice which is common to African-Americans in prison. J. Michael Waller found that Muslim inmates comprise 17–20% of the prison population, or roughly 350,000 inmates in 2003. Waller states that these inmates mostly come into prison as non-Muslims. According to him, 80% of the prisoners who "find faith" while in prison convert to Islam. These converted inmates are mostly African American, with a small but growing Hispanic minority. Waller also asserts that many converts are radicalized by outside Islamist groups linked to terrorism, but other experts suggest that when radicalization does occur it has little to no connection with these outside interests.

Notable African-American Muslims

Pre-20th century
 Abdul Rahman Ibrahima Sori, a prince from modern-day Guinea, captured and sold as a slave in the United States, freed with government intervention 40 years later, and returned and died in Liberia.

Activists 

 Malcolm X, civil rights leader

Politicians
 Ako Abdul-Samad, member of the Iowa House of Representatives (2007–present)
 Charles Bilal, former mayor of Kountze, Texas
 André Carson, U.S. Representative for Indiana's 7th congressional district (2008–present)
 Keith Ellison, Attorney General of Minnesota and former U.S. Representative for Minnesota's 5th congressional district (2007–2019)
 Jamilah Nasheed, member of the Missouri Senate (2013–present)
 John Collins-Muhammad, City of St. Louis Alderman of the 21st District
 Larry Shaw, former member of the North Carolina Senate (1995–2009)
 Ilhan Omar, U.S. Representative for Minnesota's 5th congressional district (2019-present)

Athletes
 Kareem Abdul-Jabbar, former basketball player
 Hakeem Olajuwon, former basketball player 
 Ahmad Rashad, former NFL player 
 Mahmoud Abdul-Rauf, former basketball player
 Shareef Abdur-Rahim, former basketball player
 Muhammad Ali, former professional boxer
 Rubin Carter, former professional boxer
 Shaquille O'Neal, former basketball player
 Nazr Mohammed, former basketball player
 Ibtihaj Muhammad, Olympian Professional Fencer
 Mike Tyson, former professional boxer
 Husain Abdullah, former professional NFL player
 Rasheed Wallace, former basketball player
 Jamaal Wilkes, former basketball player
 Kyrie Irving, professional basketball player
 Ameer Abdullah, professional football player
 Dominique Easley, professional football player
 Muhammad Wilkerson, professional football player
 Mohammed Sanu, professional football player
 Hamza Abdullah, former professional football player
 Husain Abdullah, former professional football player
 Az-Zahir Hakim, former professional football player and coach
 Ryan Harris, former professional football player
 Abdul Hodge, former professional football player
 Ahmad Rashad, former professional football player
 Ephraim Salaam, former professional football player
 Sharrieff Shah, football coach

Musicians 

 Ali Shaheed Muhammad, DJ and producer
 Ahmad Jamal, jazz pianist
 Akon, singer
 AR-Ab, rapper
 Art Blakey, jazz drummer
 Bas, rapper
 Beanie Sigel, rapper
 B.G. Knocc Out, rapper
 Big Daddy Kane, rapper
 Buckshot, rapper
 Busta Rhymes, rapper
 Dave East, rapper
 Divine Styler, rapper
 E.D.I. Mean, rapper
 Freddie Gibbs, rapper
 Freeway, rapper
 Ghostface Killah, rapper
 Ice Cube, rapper and actor.
 Idris Muhammad, musician
 Jay Electronica, rapper
 Jermaine Jackson, singer-songwriter
 Joe Tex, singer and musician
 Kevin Gates, rapper
 King Von, rapper
 Lil Durk, rapper
 Lupe Fiasco, rapper
 MC Ren, rapper
 MF DOOM, rapper
 Moneybagg Yo, rapper
 Mos Def, rapper
 Napoleon, rapper
 NBA YoungBoy, rapper
 PnB Rock, rapper
 Q-Tip, rapper
 Pop Smoke, rapper
 Raekown, rapper
 Rakim, rapper
 Rhymefest, rapper
 Robert "Kool" Bell, musician
 RZA, rapper
 Sahib Shihab, jazz musician
 Sean Price, rapper
 Sheck Wes, rapper
 Shy Glizzy, rapper
 Swizz Beatz, producer
 SZA, singer and songwriter
 The Jacka, rapper
 T-Pain, singer
 Westside Gunn, rapper
 Yusuf Lateef, musician

Entertainment
 Iman, fashion model and actress
 Dave Chappelle, comedian
 Mahershala Ali, actor
 Halima Aden, fashion model
 Barkhad Abdi, actor
 Yahya Abdul-Mateen II, actor

Religion
 Siraj Wahhaj
 Warith Deen Muhammad
 Khalid Abdul Muhammad

Other 

 Yusuf Bey, entrepreneur

See also

 Hispanic and Latino American Muslims
 Islam in the United States
 Muslim Romani people
 Islam and hip hop in the United States
General:
 Religion in Black America

References

Further reading
 Naqvi, S. Kaazim. Chicago Muslims and the Transformation of American Islam: Immigrants, African Americans, and the Building of the American Ummah (Rowman & Littlefield, 2019).

 
African-American Islam
Ethnoreligious groups in the United States